Phon Charoen ( is a sub-district (tambon) in Phon Charoen District, in Bueng Kan Province, northeastern Thailand. It lies in the southern part of the province. As of 2010, it had a population of 10,254 people and has jurisdiction over 11 villages. It lies along Thailand Route 222, south of Chumphu Phon and Si Wilai and north of Tha Kok Daeng.

References

Tambon of Bueng Kan province
Populated places in Bueng Kan province